Avesnes-lès-Bapaume (literally Avesnes near Bapaume) is a commune in the Pas-de-Calais department in northern France.

Geography
A small farming village, adjacent to the west of Bapaume, on the roads from Bapaume to Albert and Achiet-le-Grand.

Population

See also
Communes of the Pas-de-Calais department

References

Communes of Pas-de-Calais